Williamstown Town Hall is a civic building located in Williamstown, a suburb of Melbourne, Australia.

The hall was built in two stages, the first being the front municipal offices, designed in the Greek revival style to the design of then young architect Joseph Plottel, dating from 1919. The hall behind was added to the design of Gibbs, Finlay & Morsby, and  officially opened in 1927.

After the City of Williamstown was amalgamated with the City of Altona in 1994 to form the new City of Hobsons Bay, the building continued to be used for council meetings, though not as often as its Altona counterpart.

See also
List of town halls in Melbourne

References

Town halls in Melbourne
Government buildings completed in 1927
Greek Revival buildings
Neoclassical architecture in Australia
1927 establishments in Australia
Williamstown, Victoria
Buildings and structures in the City of Hobsons Bay